Comorta plinthina is a species of moth of the family Pyralidae described by Alfred Jefferis Turner in 1905. It is found in northern Australia.

References

Moths described in 1905
Anerastiini